Seamus Rawles Malliagh, known by his recording alias Iglooghost, is an Irish-born English musician, producer and songwriter based in London.

Career
Malliagh released a cassette in 2014 titled Treetunnels on Error Broadcast. In 2015, he released his second EP titled Chinese Nü Yr on Brainfeeder. He also released in that same year a collaborative EP with Mr. Yote titled Milk Empire through Activia Benz. In March 2016, he released his third EP titled Little Grids, again on Brainfeeder, and in September 2017 he released his album Neō Wax Bloom, also on Brainfeeder.

On February 4, 2021 Iglooghost announced the oncoming release of his fourth album, Lei Line Eon, which was released on 2 April alongside the release of the album's lead single, "Sylph Fossil". As of October 2022, Iglooghost has over 90,000 active monthly listeners on Spotify, and 25,000 subscribers on YouTube.

Discography

Studio albums
Treetunnels (2014, Error Broadcast, limited edition)
Neō Wax Bloom (2017, Brainfeeder)
XYZ (2019, Gloo, collaboration with Kai Whiston & BABii)
Lei Line Eon (2021, Gloo)

EPs
Chinese Nü Yr (2015, Brainfeeder)
Milk Empire (2015, Activia Benz, collaboration with Mr. Yote)
Little Grids (2016, Brainfeeder)
Clear Tamei (2018, Brainfeeder)
Steel Mogu (2018, Brainfeeder)

Mixtapes
Places U Hide... Sketches (2015, self-published)

References

External links
Iglooghost on Bandcamp
Iglooghost on SoundCloud

Date of birth missing (living people)
Living people
Constructed language creators
Irish electronic musicians
Irish hip hop musicians
Irish emigrants to the United Kingdom
English electronic musicians
English hip hop musicians
English record producers
Musicians from Dorset
People from Shaftesbury
Ninja Tune
Brainfeeder artists
1996 births